Marcos Márquez Lebrero (born 23 July 1977) is a Spanish retired footballer. A striker, he was of Gitano origin.

Over nine seasons (his professional career lasted 15 years) he amassed Segunda División totals of 249 matches and 78 goals, mainly at the service of Las Palmas.

Club career
Born in Seville, Andalusia, and raised in the youth academy of local Sevilla FC, Márquez left in 1999 and signed for Atlético Madrid B, playing one season with the club in the Segunda División. In July 2000 he returned to his native region by joining Córdoba CF, where he underperformed.

After stints with AD Ceuta and CD Leganés, both from Segunda División B, Márquez moved to UD Las Palmas on 15 June 2005. From then onwards he became one of the most consistent players of the team, while also captaining them on various occasions; El Matador (nickname he received whilst in the Canary Islands) went down in the history of the club on 24 June 2006 as he scored the goal that meant its return to division two, the game's only at CD Linares after a pass from Nauzet Alemán.

Márquez continued to feature heavily in the subsequent years: in the 2006–07 campaign, he won both the Pichichi Trophy and the Zarra Trophy after netting 21 times. After forming an efficient attacking duo with Adrián Colunga in 2007–08 (29 goals between the pair) he was again the main striker the following season and added 21 more, good enough for third in the individual chart although his side barely avoided a drop.

After a poor 2009–10 campaign – 34 matches, three goals – Márquez left Las Palmas and signed for another club in the second tier, UD Salamanca, suffering relegation in his first year. In August 2012, aged 35, he announced his retirement from football.

References

External links

1977 births
Living people
Footballers from Seville
Spanish footballers
Romani footballers
Association football forwards
Segunda División players
Segunda División B players
Tercera División players
CD Utrera players
Sevilla Atlético players
Atlético Madrid B players
Atlético Madrid footballers
Córdoba CF players
AD Ceuta footballers
CD Leganés players
UD Las Palmas players
UD Salamanca players